Ralph ("Nick") Nicholas Köster (born 22 February 1989 in Robertson) is a South African rugby union player. He last played professionally for Bristol in the position of Flanker or Eight Man. He is currently captain of Cambridge University R.U.F.C.

Köster attended Bishops College in Cape Town and played in their First XV rugby team in 2006 and 2007. In 2006, he played alongside Martin Muller and Mathew Turner. Köster made the Western Province Craven Week side in 2006 and 2007 when he was captain. He was called up for South Africa Schools in both 2006 and 2007.

He made his Currie Cup debut at the age of 19, playing at 8th man in 2008, and was picked on the bench for the Barbarians side to play  at Wembley, later that year.

Köster had Province's highest tackle count (24 tackles) against the Blue Bulls, while his 11 ball carries was second only to Duane Vermeulen and he was one of only three WP players to secure a turnover.

In October 2012, it was announced that he would join Bath. He scored his first try for his new club against Italian team Calvisano in the Amlin Challenge Cup.

He joined then RFU Championship club Bristol on a season long loan from August 2013, which evolved into Nick earning a permanent contract with Bristol, aiding them in their promotion to the Aviva Premiership in 2016.

In 2014 Nick became an ambassador for Project Zulu, a UK based charity running educational development projects in the Madadeni township, KZN, South Africa.  During Project Zulu’s 2015 and 2016 UK Choir Tours Nick arranged for the South Africa choir to perform on the pitch at half time of Bristol games. He and his wife have also hosted young people from Madadeni during Project Zulu fundraising choir tours in 2015 and 2016.

Prior to the 2017/18 Aviva Premiership season, Koster was one of several players released by Bristol.

Soon after leaving Bristol, Koster joined Cambridge University to study an MSt in Social Innovation. He also joined the famous Universities' rugby team for the 2017-2018 rugby season. Bringing plentiful professional experience to the entirely amateur first team, made up of students. On the 19 January 2018 Koster was named as men's captain for the Cambridge University R.U.F.C. 2018 rugby season.

References

External links
Stormers profile

itsrugby.co.uk profile

Afrikaner people
Living people
1989 births
South African rugby union players
Stormers players
Western Province (rugby union) players
Bath Rugby players
Rugby union number eights
People from Robertson, Western Cape
University of Cape Town alumni
South African expatriate rugby union players
Expatriate rugby union players in England
South African expatriate sportspeople in England
South Africa Under-20 international rugby union players
Rugby union players from the Western Cape